Low Key is the 14th studio album, and fifth cover album, by Filipina singer-actress Regine Velasquez-Alcasid, released on November 14, 2008 in physical format (cassette & CDs) and digital. The album was Velasquez's first album with Universal Records. It was certified gold a week after its release with sales of over 12,500 units on its first day and achieves platinum certification after a month. It became one of the best selling albums for year 2008-2009.

The album also includes a minus-one CD of all the tracks. An Asian edition of the album was released on December 16, 2008 and a Philippine re-release which feature a Christmas song bonus track original by Jim Brickman with a different cover album art. The album cover art is taken by Filipino photographer Mark Nicdao at Velasquez's home.

Background
The song choices for the album were chosen by Velasquez herself together with her sisters, Cacai & Dianne from the list of their favorite songs heard on the radio during their childhood. According to Velasquez, she wanted the album to be easy listening and relaxed as possible, making it a departure from her “big ballads” usually heard in her previous works. As a result, the album was named Low Key, a remark on her mellow singing style in the whole process of its production. The songs included are very personal to Velasquez and also dedicated to her fans. There are also two songs included on the album that are dedicated to Velasquez's parents, Gerry and Tessie Velasquez; Dan Fogelberg's "Leader of the Band" for her father and Billy Joel's "She's Always a Woman" for her mother.

Awards
Low Key won at the first Star Awards for Music for Female Recording Of The Year, Female Pop Artist Of The Year, Music Video Of The Year for "And I Love You So", Revival Album Of The Year and Album Cover Design. The album won Female Recording Of The Year and Revival Album Of The Year on October 29, 2009 at SM Skydome. It was also nominated at the 22nd Awit Awards for Best Selling Album Of The Year and Best Album Package.

Track listing

Credits
Personnel
Kathleen Dy-Go – executive producer
Regine Velasquez-Alcasid – executive producer
Ito Rapadas – line producer
Jay Saturnino D. Lumboy – graphic designer, album concept
Mark Nicdao – photography
Production
Homer Flores – arranger (tracks 1 & 3)
Jimmy Antiporda – arranger (track 2)
Bobby Velasco – arranger (tracks 4 & 17)
Bond Samson – arranger (tracks 5 & 9)
Niño Regalado – arranger (tracks 6 & 16)
Fred Garcia – arranger (tracks 7, 12 & 14)
Noel Mendez – arranger (tracks 8, & 11)
Raul Mitra – arranger (track 10)
Ito Rapadas – arranger (track 18)
Jay Durias – background vocals, arranger (track 15)
Jim Brickman – background vocals, piano (track 18)
Noel Mendez – guitars (tracks 8 &11)
Janno Queyquep – guitars (tracks 2, 3, 4, 5, 6, 7, 10, 12, 14, 15, 16, 17 &18)
Cezar Aguas – guitars (tracks 9 &13), arranger (track 13)

References

See also
Regine Velasquez discography
List of best-selling albums in the Philippines

2008 albums
Regine Velasquez albums
Covers albums